Satya Brata Sinha (8 August 1944 – 19 March 2019), known as S. B. Sinha was a jurist and a former judge of the Supreme Court of India.

Introduction
Justice S. B. Sinha was born on 8 August 1944 at Dhanbad in the state of Jharkhand, India. He passed his matriculation examination from H.E. School, Dhanbad and received his Bachelor of Laws (B.L.) Degree from Chota Nagpur Law College in 1967. Justice joined the Dhanbad District Court in 1968 after which he shifted his practice to Ranchi upon constitution of the Permanent Bench of the Patna High Court in 1976.

He was designated as Senior Advocate by the Patna High Court. Subsequently, he was appointed the first Government Advocate of the Ranchi Bench of the Patna High Court and was elevated to the Bench of Patna High Court on 9 March 1987. He was transferred to the Calcutta High Court on 11 May 1994. He has served as the Chief Justice of the High Courts of Calcutta, Andhra Pradesh and Delhi.

He was elevated as a Judge of the Supreme Court of India on 3 October 2002 and retired on 8 August 2009.

TDSAT Chairman

On 3 November 2009, after retirement from the Supreme Court, Justice S. B. Sinha was appointed the Chairman of the Telecom Disputes Settlement and Appellate Tribunal (TDSAT) succeeding Justice Arun Kumar who retired in September, 2009.

Death 
Justice Sinha died on 19 March 2019 at the age of 74 after brief illness in New Delhi. His funeral was held on 20 March. Leading legal luminaries and his contemporaries condoled the death of a stalwart of India's legal fraternity.

References

1944 births
2019 deaths
20th-century Indian judges
20th-century Indian lawyers
Justices of the Supreme Court of India
People from Dhanbad